Scottsdale Fashion Square is an upscale luxury shopping mall located in the downtown area of Scottsdale, Arizona. It has consistently been one of the most profitable malls in the United States, being ranked in 2016 as the second highest sales per square foot mall in the country, and as of 2016, it was ranked in the top 25 most visited malls in the country by Travel + Leisure magazine. The mall is located on the northwest corner of Scottsdale Road and Camelback Road in Scottsdale, Arizona, and has been owned by Westcor, a subsidiary of Macerich, since 2002.

History 
During the 1930s and 1940s, the land which would become the Scottsdale Fashion Square was too far from the established Scottsdale and Phoenix business areas to be considered valuable. A Ryan-Evans drug store was the only retail establishment on the site. During the 1940s the 40-acre site was purchased by Harry Lenart. In the 1950s he began to plan for a small shopping center. In 1959, the center opened consisting of four stores in addition to the existing drug store: a grocery store, barber shop, liquor store, and camera store. In 1960 a steakhouse, built by Joe Hunt, Sr. was added.

Scottsdale Fashion Square was originally built as a 3-story open-air structure in 1961. The structure was designed by Edward L. Varney Associates, and built by Kitchell Contractors. It was anchored by two local Phoenix stores, department store Goldwater's and supermarket AJ Bayless. At the time, the primary competitor was the Los Arcos Mall, a fully enclosed mall built in 1969, also located in Scottsdale. Its early financial success led to an expansion of the west-side of the mall in 1974, which nearly doubled the square-footage of the mall. This expansion also added an additional department store, Diamond's, to the northern section of the mall.

In 1977, a competing mall, the fully enclosed Camelview Plaza, was built just west of Scottsdale Fashion Square, on the other side of North 70th Street. The competing mall was developed by Chicago business-man John F. Cuneo. Belli & Belli also of Chicago were the architects of the new mall. Camelview Plaza boasted Los Angeles department store Bullock's and Sakowitz. The shopping center also included a Harkins Camelview Theatre on an outparcel.

For several years, the two malls competed for shoppers and tenants. In 1982 after Westcor's purchase of the mall, the owners agreed to connect the malls by building a two-story retail bridge across North 70th Street, replacing the shuttle service that ran between the two malls. In the process, the street separating the two malls was sunk below grade-level, widened to four lanes, and renamed North Goldwater Boulevard. The two malls were largely gutted and completely renovated. A ground-level food court, anchored by a 7-screen Harkins Theatres cinema, was also added. The redevelopment was completed in 1991, closely followed by the addition of Neiman Marcus (in the former Sakowitz) in 1992.

Goldwater's became J. W. Robinson's in 1989, only to be converted into Robinsons-May in 1993. Bullock's closed its doors at Camelview Plaza in 1996, and remained vacant for several years. That same year, Westcor purchased Camelview Plaza and renamed the entire  shopping plaza, Scottsdale Fashion Square. The new ownership brought major changes to the mall, the largest being the addition of a new wing anchored by Arizona's first Nordstrom store and featuring many upscale retailers. The expansion was completed in 1998 and was designed by Callison Architects Inc. of Seattle the addition was built by the original contractor Kitchell.

Sears briefly occupied the former Dillard's store, only to be replaced by Macy's in 2002.

The merger between Federated Department Stores and May Department Stores brought the closure Robinsons-May in June 2006, leading the mall to demolish the former department store and build another new wing anchored by Barneys New York. The new wing, which also featured an H&M store, opened in 2009. That same year, the first Microsoft Store opened elsewhere in the mall.

Another expansion was added in 2015: a two-level building with Dick's Sporting Goods on the lower level and a new 14-screen Harkins Theatres cinema on the top level. In early 2016, Barneys New York announced it would close its Scottsdale Fashion Square store. In late 2016 the mall's owner, Macerich, announced plans of a new renovation, in excess of $100 million, which will include high-end residential units, a hotel, a new luxury entrance, hospitality areas and office space. Construction began in 2017, with the renovation completed in Fall 2018.

About a year after the Harkins had moved, a local theater opened in its place. Desert Stages Theater, a community play house for both old and young audiences, has now been an addition of Fashion Square for three years (after their ten-year lease in a lot across the street, they moved right into the mall behind the Jamba Juice).

In 2020, the mall was vandalized and looted after protesters violated curfew during the George Floyd protests. The police made twelve arrests including YouTube star Jake Paul, who claimed that he did not take part in the looting and was only recording it. Paul was charged with criminal trespass and unlawful assembly on June 4 for entering the mall illegally with the rioters. The first court date began on July 8. On August 5, 2020, the charges were dismissed without prejudice, with the Scottsdale Police Department saying it was "in the best interest of the community" and that a federal criminal investigation would be completed instead.

Later in 2021 a fitness center, Life Time Fitness announced they would be replacing the Equinox outside of the northwest luxury entrance. The 40,000-square-foot, three-level fitness center will be outside the mall's so-called "luxury wing," where Nobu, Tocaya Modern Mexican, Zinque, and other restaurants are located. Previously, Equinox, another luxury fitness brand, was going to open in the space, but those plans ultimately fell through, though it's unclear why.

In early October 2022, Macerich reported they were going to be continuing the luxury renovations from 2018 throughout the exterior and interior of the southern Nordstrom wing. It would include “two-story storefronts and exterior-facing retail buildings at the south entrance, and a porte cochere that will incorporate up to five destination restaurants.” and a luxury valet service. Macerich also states “Everything will come together to deliver a more cohesive and holistic luxury experience for guests and retailers throughout the property,”. This renovation started in late January 2023.

Municipal bond controversy 

A parking garage adjacent to the Scottsdale Fashion Square Mall (aka the "Nordstrom Garage") was constructed by Scottsdale Fashion Square Partners and leased to the City of Scottsdale in 1998 for 50 years for $31,375,000. In 2012 Scottsdale Mayor Jim Lane and the city council approved a prepayment of the lease, financed by issuance of municipal bonds. However, in 2015 the IRS notified the city that the issuance is being challenged for non-compliance with the federal tax code or rules. One possible basis for such challenges is failure of the "public purpose test".

References

External links 
 Scottsdale Fashion Square Official Site
 Scottsdale Waterfront Residences
 

Shopping malls in Arizona
Macerich
Buildings and structures in Scottsdale, Arizona
Shopping malls in Maricopa County, Arizona
Shopping malls established in 1961
Tourist attractions in Scottsdale, Arizona